St Cyrus railway station served the village of St Cyrus, Aberdeenshire, Scotland from 1865 to 1951.

History 
The station was opened on 1 November 1865 by the Montrose and Bervie Railway.

The goods yard was to the west of the line and slightly south of the station. It had a loop, a goods shed and a  crane. The yard was able to accommodate live stock.

The station was host to a LNER camping coach in 1935 and possibly one for some of 1934, then it hosted two coaches from 1936 to 1939. A camping coach was also positioned here by the Scottish Region from 1957 to 1963.

The station closed to both passengers and goods traffic when the line closed to passengers on 1 October 1951. The line closed for goods traffic on 23 May 1966.

References

Bibliography

External links 
 St Cyrus at Railscot
 St Cyrus at Canmore

Disused railway stations in Aberdeenshire
Former North British Railway stations
Railway stations in Great Britain opened in 1865
Railway stations in Great Britain closed in 1951
1865 establishments in Scotland
1951 disestablishments in Scotland